The Way It Was is a 1974 to 1978 PBS television series featuring athletes reminiscing about a particular sporting event from the past. Hosted by Curt Gowdy, the bulk of the 30-minute broadcast was dedicated to rebroadcasting the game, uninterrupted but in edited form, with a short 5-minute discussion segment at the end of the show. The show is also notable for its computer animated intro with the song "Happy Days Are Here Again".

Gerry Gross, who created Sports Challenge, produced the show in association with KCET in Los Angeles.  PBS aired the show from October 3, 1974 to 1978. Mobil Corporation provided major funding for the series, and had also released a 1975 book on the series, as a tie-in with the show's first season.

In 1976, the show was nominated for an Emmy Award in the category of "Outstanding Edited Sports Series."

Reruns currently air on ESPN Classic, occasionally under banner titles such as NFL's Greatest Games or Classic World Series Film.

References

PBS original programming
Sports programming on PBS
1974 American television series debuts
1978 American television series endings
American sports television series